Akaipur is a village and a gram panchayat in the Bangaon CD block in the Bangaon subdivision of the North 24 Parganas district in the state of West Bengal, India.  Pin, 743710

See also

References 

Villages in North 24 Parganas district